John Conyers (6 March 1650 – 10 March 1725) of Walthamstow, Essex was an English lawyer and politician who sat in the English and British House of Commons for 30 years from 1695 to 1725.

Conyers was the eldest son of Tristram Conyers, serjeant-at-law, MP of Walthamstow and his wife Winifred Gerard, daughter of Sir Gilbert Gerard, 1st Baronet, MP of Flamberds, Harrow-on-the-Hill, Middlesex. He was educated at Merchant Taylors’ School from 1663 to 1665  and matriculated at Queen’s College, Oxford on 7 April 1666, aged 16. He then studied law at the Middle Temple from 1666, was called to the bar in 1672 and was made King's Counsel (KC) in about 1693. Conyers married, by licence dated 16 January 1681, Mary Lee, the daughter and heiress of George Lee of Stoke St, Milborough, Shropshire He became a bencher of his Inn in 1702. He was a cousin of Thomas Conyers, MP for Durham City,

Conyers was returned as Member of Parliament for East Grinstead at the 1695 general election, and sat until the 1708 general election when he was defeated. However also in 1708, he was returned unopposed as MP for West Looe. He was returned unopposed for East Grinstead again at the 1710 and 1713  general elections.

He was returned as MP for East Grinstead again in 1715 and 1722 and voted against the Government in all instances. He sat until  his death in 1725.
 
Conyers died on 10 March 1725. He and his wife had 16 children, including a son and five daughters. He was succeeded as MP for East Grinstead by his son Edward Conyers (c. 1693 – 23 April 1742).

References

Further reading
 

 

 

1650 births
1725 deaths
Place of birth missing
People from East Grinstead
Alumni of The Queen's College, Oxford
Members of the Middle Temple
English MPs 1695–1698
English MPs 1698–1700
English MPs 1701
English MPs 1701–1702
English MPs 1702–1705
English MPs 1705–1707
Members of the Parliament of Great Britain for constituencies in Cornwall
British MPs 1707–1708
British MPs 1708–1710
British MPs 1710–1713
British MPs 1713–1715
British MPs 1715–1722
British MPs 1722–1727